Felice Rama  is an Italian rugby union coach of the 1940s. He coached at club level for R.S. Ginnastica Torino.

Playing career
Felice Rama was a member of the R.S. Ginnastica Torino team that won the 1947 Campionati italiani. In honour of this, Rama's name appears alongside his teammates on a plaque affixed to Motovelodromo Fausto Coppi in Turin, the squad was; Ausonio Alacevich, Guido Aleati, Sergio Aleati, Roberto Antonioli, Angelo Arrigoni, Vincenzo Bertolotto, Bianco, Giovanni Bonino, Campi, Gabriele Casalegno, Chiosso, Chiosso, Guido Cornarino,  Mario Dotti IV, Aldo Guglielminotti, Pescarmona, Piovano, Rocca, Felice Rama (coach), Siliquini, Giovanni Tamagno, and Sandro Vigliano.

References

Benedetto Pasqua; Mirio Da Roit, Cent'anni di rugby a Torino (One Hundred Years of Rugby in Turin), Torino, Ananke [2011]
Francesco Volpe; Paolo Pacetti, Rugby 2012, Roma, Zesi [2011]
Gianluca Barca; Gian Franco Bellè, La Sesta Nazione (The Sixth Nation), Parma, Grafiche Step [2008]

External links
Search for "Rama" at espnscrum.com
Search for "Rama" at rugbyleagueproject.org

Italian rugby union coaches
Possibly living people
Year of birth missing